The Maluku Islands (formerly the Moluccas) are a group of islands within Indonesia. The region is administered under two provinces: Maluku and North Maluku.

Major islands in the province of North Maluku

 Halmahera
 Ternate
 Tidore
 Morotai
 Makian
 Moti Island
 Bacan
 Mandioli
 Kasiruta
 Gebe

In the Banda Sea

Major islands, or island groups, in Maluku Province

 Ambon
 Buru
 Seram
 Haruku
 Saparua
 Gorong Islands
 Watubela Islands
 Kai Islands
 Aru Islands
 Tanimbar
 Babar
 Leti
 Wetar
 Banda Islands

Maluku